Pachybates is a genus of flies in the family Athericidae.

Species
Pachybates adeps Stuckenberg, 1961
Pachybates braunsi (Bequaert, 1921)
Pachybates incompletus (Bezzi, 1926)

References

Athericidae
Brachycera genera
Taxa named by Mario Bezzi
Diptera of Africa